The 1980–81 Alabama Crimson Tide men's basketball team represented the University of Alabama in the 1980–81 NCAA Division I men's basketball season. The team's head coach was Wimp Sanderson, who was in his first season at Alabama. The team played their home games at Coleman Coliseum in Tuscaloosa, Alabama. They finished the season 18–11, 10–8 in SEC play, finishing in fourth place.

The Tide were eliminated in the first round of the SEC tournament by the Georgia Bulldogs.  Afterwards, the Tide accepted a bid to the 1981 National Invitation Tournament and reached the second round where they lost to Duke University.

Roster

References 

Alabama Crimson Tide men's basketball seasons
Alabama
Alabama
1980 in sports in Alabama
1981 in sports in Alabama